Cathrinus is a Latinized masculine version of the feminine name Katherine. The name originated from the Greek feminine name Αἰκατερίνα or Αἰκατερίνη (Aikaterina, Aikaterinē), which is of unknown etymology. The earliest known use of the Greek name is in reference to one of the first Christian saints, Catherine of Alexandria. Cathrinus is a rare name.

The name Cathrinus is mainly used in Dutch and Scandinavian-speaking countries, but has also been found in the German-speaking realm, e.g. as a Latinized surname in the 17th century. Notable people with the given name include:
Cathrinus Bang, Norwegian literary historian
Elias Cathrinus Kiær, Norwegian businessman
Bernhard Cathrinus Pauss, Norwegian theologian, educator, author and humanitarian and missionary leader
Bernhard Cathrinus Paus, Norwegian orthopedic surgeon and humanitarian
Andreas Cathrinus Backer, Norwegian journalist, newspaper editor and organizational leader

See also 
Katherine

References 

Latin masculine given names